Homoeosoma terminella is a species of snout moth in the genus Homoeosoma. It was described by Ragonot in 1901. It is found in South Africa.

References

Endemic moths of South Africa
Moths described in 1901
Phycitini